Kristinn Ármannson (1895–1966) was the rector of Menntaskólinn í Reykjavík from 1956 to 1965. He is the author of Latin Grammar, a book still used in all schools that teach Latin in Iceland.

References
Kristinn Ármannsson's profile at Open Library

Kristinn Armannsson
1895 births
1966 deaths
Date of birth missing
Place of birth missing
Date of death missing
Place of death missing